Talmont may refer to:

Talmont-sur-Gironde, a commune in France
Talmont-Saint-Hilaire, a commune in France
Château de Talmont, a medieval castle in the Talmont-Saint-Hilaire commune, France

Talmont (surname)

See also